Devadarshini is an Indian actress who predominantly appears in Tamil films, in addition to few Telugu films and television series. She began her career as a television anchor before venturing into acting, first in television and then in films. She mainly appears in supporting roles and often performs comic roles. 

She has performed in television serials including Marmadesam and Athipookal.

Biography 
Devadarshini was born in Chennai to a Telugu-speaking family. She studied commerce in college and later gained a master's degree in Applied Psychology.

While still in college, she began anchoring television shows. She was then offered an opportunity to act in the Doordarshan serial Kanavugal Ilavasam, which led to her landing a role in the mystery series Marmadesam by Naga. She was introduced in Ramany vs Ramany Part 02, which was also directed by  Naga.  Devadarshini became part of the series' second installment, Vidathu Karuppu, which she considers a "big turning point" in her life as it established her in the industry.

She won her the Tamil Nadu State Film Award for Best Comedian for Parthiban Kanavu (2003). She played the lead role in Sakthi Pirakuthu (2010), a film made by an NGO. After Muni 2: Kanchana (2011), she was continuously doing humorous characters.

Personal life 
In 2002, Devadarshini married Chetan, a television actor. They first worked together on Marmadesam - Vidathu Karuppu. Her daughter Niyati made her debut in 96 portraying the younger version of her mother's character.

Awards and nominations

Filmography

Films

Television

References

External links 
 

21st-century Indian actresses
Actresses from Chennai
Actresses in Tamil cinema
Actresses in Tamil television
Indian film actresses
Indian television actresses
Indian television presenters
Indian women television presenters
Living people
Tamil actresses
Tamil Nadu State Film Awards winners
Year of birth missing (living people)